The discography of Fastball, an American rock band, consists of seven studio albums, one live album, one compilation album and eleven singles.

The band's debut album, Make Your Mama Proud, was released in April 1996. The album sold about 3,000 copies in its first year of release, failing to chart and putting the band's future in doubt. One single was released from the album, "Are You Ready for the Fallout?". The band's single "The Way" was released in February 1998 as the first single from the band's then-upcoming second studio album. It was a commercial success, peaking at number 4 on the Billboard Hot 100 Airplay chart and topping the Canadian Singles Chart. It also managed to chart in several other countries, including Australia, where peaked at number 14 and was certified gold by the Australian Recording Industry Association (ARIA). The band's second studio album, All the Pain Money Can Buy, was released the following month. The album peaked at number 29 on the US Billboard 200 and at number 18 on the Canadian Albums Chart, fueled by the success of "The Way". It went on to sell over 1,250,000 copies in the United States, earning a platinum certification from the Recording Industry Association of America (RIAA). The album's second single, "Fire Escape", peaked at number 86 on the US Billboard Hot 100 and at number 11 on the Canadian Singles Chart. "Out of My Head", the album's third and final single, gave the band its highest-charting song on the Hot 100, where it peaked at number 20.

The Harsh Light of Day, Fastball's third studio album, was released in September 2000. It peaked at number 97 on the Billboard 200 and sold 85,000 copies in the United States. Its lead single, "You're an Ocean", peaked at number 1 on the US Billboard Bubbling Under Hot 100 Singles chart. Two more singles were released from the album, "Love Is Expensive and Free" and "This Is Not My Life". A compilation album, Painting the Corners: The Best of Fastball, was released in August 2002. The live album Live from Jupiter Records was released in August 2003. The band's fourth studio album, Keep Your Wig On, was released in June 2004 and spawned three singles: "Airstream", "Drifting Away" and "Lou-ee Lou-ee". Little White Lies, the band's fifth studio album, was released in April 2009. Its title track was released as the album's first and only single, where it peaked at 26 on the Triple A charts.

In 2013, they released their first digital-only single, "Love Comes in Waves".

Fastball released their sixth studio album, Step Into Light, on May 19, 2017. The band released four singles and videos in support of this album, including "Step Into Light," "I Will Never Let You Down," "We're On Our Way," and "Best Friend."

In 2019, Fastball released The Help Machine. In support of the album, the band released music videos for the singles "The Help Machine" and "White Collar."

Fastball released its first EP, Soundtrack, in March 2022.

Albums

Studio albums

Live albums

EPs

Compilation albums

Singles

Guest appearances

Music videos

Notes

A  "The Way" did not enter the Billboard Hot 100, but peaked at number 5 on the Hot 100 Airplay chart.
B  "You're an Ocean" did not enter the Billboard Hot 100, but peaked at number 1 on the Bubbling Under Hot 100 Singles chart, which acts as a 25-song extension to the Hot 100.

References

External links
 Official website
 Fastball Patreon page
 Fastball at AllMusic
 
 

Discographies of American artists
Rock music group discographies